Serruria brownii, the bottlebrush spiderhead, is a flower-bearing shrub that belongs to the family Proteaceae and forms part of the fynbos. The plant is native to the Western Cape, South Africa.

Description

Fire destroys the plant but the seeds survive. Two months after flowering, the fruit falls off and ants disperse the seeds. They store the seeds in their nests. The plant is bisexual. Pollination takes place through the action of insects.

Distribution and habitat
The plant occurs on the plains from Hopefield to Tygerberg.

Gallery

References

brownii
Endemic flora of South Africa
Flora of the Cape Provinces
Plants described in 1856
Taxa named by Carl Meissner